South Carolina Highway 88 (SC 88) is a  state highway in northern Anderson County, South Carolina with a brief entry into southern Pickens County, connecting Pendleton and areas south of Powdersville. It is sometimes considered an alternate route for U.S. Route 123 (US 123).

Route description
The route travels generally in a west–east direction, signed to begin at an intersection with SC 28 Business (SC 28 Bus.; North Mechanic Street) in downtown Pendleton. However, SCDOT designates the western terminus to not start until North Broad Street a few blocks later. East of Pendleton, SC 88 travels through somewhat rural areas and has a roundabout intersection with US 178. The route continues until it terminates at an intersection with SC 8, west of the suburban areas of Powdersville.

History

Major intersections

See also

References

External links

088
Transportation in Anderson County, South Carolina
Transportation in Pickens County, South Carolina